Ninurta coeruleopunctatus (syn. Cordylus coeruleopunctatus), the blue-spotted girdled lizard or simply blue-spotted lizard, is a monotypic genus that is endemic to southern, coastal South Africa.

References

External links
 Blue-spotted girdled lizard
 Ninurta gen. nov.: Stanley et al, 2011, Between a rock and a hard polytomy: Rapid radiation in the rupicolous girdled lizards (Squamata: Cordylidae)
 

Cordylidae
Reptiles described in 1913
Endemic reptiles of South Africa
Taxa named by Paul Ayshford Methuen
Taxa named by John Hewitt (herpetologist)